In the Pilot Pen Tennis competition of 2007, the women's doubles event was won by Sania Mirza and Mara Santangelo.

Seeds

Draw

External links
Women's doubles draw 1 2

Women's Doubles